Trevor Rees-Jones (also known as Trevor Rees; born 3 March 1968) is a British author and former bodyguard who was badly injured in a car crash in Paris that killed Diana, Princess of Wales, in 1997. Because he suffered a serious head injury, he does not recall any details from the crash.

Some media reports claimed he was wearing a seat belt and survived, but investigations revealed that none of the occupants of the car were wearing their seat belts.

Early life 
Rees-Jones was born on 3 March 1968 in Rinteln, West Germany, the middle-born of three boys of Colin Rees, a surgeon in the British Army, and Gill, a nurse. He has an older brother, Gareth, and younger brother, John. At ten, he returned with his family to Oswestry, on the Welsh border near his father's childhood home. At Fitzalan High School, he enrolled in the Combined Cadet Force.

Military career and first marriage 
In 1987, Rees-Jones enlisted in the 1st Battalion of the Parachute Regiment, served one tour of duty in Northern Ireland and was awarded the General Service Medal.

On 12 August 1995, he married his first wife, Sue Jones, in Oswestry, where the couple had met at Fitzalan High School. Jones filed for divorce in June 1997.

Car crash, injuries, and aftermath 
On 31 August 1997, Rees-Jones was seriously injured in the crash that resulted in the death of Princess Diana. The Princess's boyfriend, Dodi Fayed, and their chauffeur, Henri Paul, were found dead inside the car; Rees-Jones was the sole survivor of the crash. His face was flattened, with numerous bones broken or crushed, and was reconstructed afterwards with old family photos by French facial doctor Luc Chikhani, with about 150 pieces of titanium to hold the bones together and recreate the original shape. Within a year, his face was nearly back to normal.

Hospital care costs were paid by Dodi's father, Mohamed Al-Fayed, Rees-Jones' employer at the time of the crash, and the rest by the British National Health Service (NHS). At first, it was widely rumoured that Rees-Jones had lost his tongue in the crash, but this was not true. He underwent a ten-hour operation to restore his jaw to a normal condition.

After spending more than a month in hospital, Rees-Jones finally returned to the United Kingdom on 3 October 1997. At the time, he was able to communicate only by whispering and writing down answers. He resigned from his job as a bodyguard on 19 May 1998. Al-Fayed was reported as saying that his job would be available if he wished to return.

Recovery and later life 
Following recovery from his injuries, he moved to north Shropshire and for some time worked in a small family-run sportswear shop in Oswestry. He remarried on 15 February 2003, to Ann Scott, a teacher at Belvidere School, Shrewsbury. The ceremony took place in Welshpool, Wales.

He wrote a book, published in 2000 and titled The Bodyguard's Story: Diana, the Crash, and the Sole Survivor, about his experiences, with the help of ghostwriter Moira Johnston. The book reconstructed the events from Rees-Jones's partial memories and those of his family and friends. He decided to write the book because many bizarre stories had circulated about the crash and because his former employer, Al-Fayed, had accused him of not doing his job properly.

See also 
 Diana: Last Days of a Princess

References

External links

1968 births
Living people
People from Oswestry
Bodyguards
British autobiographers
British Parachute Regiment soldiers
Sole survivors